GK2 may refer to:

Gabriel Knight 2, a 1995 video game
Ace Attorney Investigations 2, a 2011 video game released as Gyakuten Kenji 2 in Japan
 N-acetylgalactosamine kinase, an enzyme